DisplayWrite (sometimes written as Displaywrite) was a word processor software application that IBM developed and marketed for the IBM PC and PCjr. It was among the company's first internally developed, commercially sold PC software titles.

DisplayWrite's feature set was based on the IBM Displaywriter System, a dedicated microcomputer-based word processing machine. Because the two systems were so similar, an experienced Displaywriter user could start using DisplayWrite immediately.

Versions

DisplayWrite/PC 
For the Intel platform there were DisplayWrite versions for PC/MS-DOS and DisplayWrite 5/2 programmed under OS/2.

DisplayWrite/36 

DisplayWrite/36 was the word processing component of IBM Office/36, which allowed an office to use the SQL-based database file for labels and form letters.

DisplayWrite/370 
DisplayWrite/370, a much more powerful version with full graphics and WYSIWYG support, was supported for IBM zSeries mainframe computers until May 2015. (see IBM Displaywriter System). DW/370 was a host-based word processor. It was marketed between 1993 and 2015 for MVS/CICS (now z/OS) and VM/CMS.

File format 
IBM DisplayWrite's native file format is based on IBM's DCA (Document Content Architecture) RFT (Revisable Form Text) specification, but adds additional structures. Depending on the DisplayWrite version, the document files use .DOC or .TXT file name extension. The DisplayWrite software can export to and import from pure DCA/RFT files (which typically have .DCA or .RFT file name extension). RFT (IBM Revisable Form Text) should not be confused with RTF (Rich Text Format), which is a Microsoft specification.

Further reading 
 Dennis P. Curtin: Displaywrite 4: Procedures Manual, Prentice-Hall 1988,

References 

DisplayWrite
Word processors
DOS software
IBM mainframe software